The Immoral Traffic (Scotland) Act 1902 (2 Edw. VII c. 11) was an Act of Parliament of the Parliament of the United Kingdom, given royal assent on 22 July 1902 and repealed in 1976.

The Act, which extended only to Scotland, provided that any man who "knowingly lives wholly or in part" on income gained through prostitution, or any man who "solicits or importunes for immoral purposes" in a public place were guilty of a criminal offence, punishable by up to three months imprisonment with hard labour by a court of summary conviction.

It further provided that if evidence was given to a court that there is reason to believe a house was used for the purposes of prostitution, and that a man on the premises was living on the earnings of that activity, a court could issue a warrant for the house to be entered and searched, and the man arrested. If a man was proved to live with (or habitually keep company with) a prostitute, and have no visible means of support, he could be deemed to be living off the earnings of prostitution unless proven otherwise.

The Act was repealed by the Sexual Offences (Scotland) Act 1976.

References
The Public General Acts Passed in the Second Year of the Reign of His Majesty King Edward the Seventh. London: printed for His Majesty's Stationery Office. 1902.
Chronological table of the statutes; HMSO, London. 1993.

United Kingdom Acts of Parliament 1902
Repealed United Kingdom Acts of Parliament
1902 in Scotland
Acts of the Parliament of the United Kingdom concerning Scotland